Typha  is a genus of about 30 species of monocotyledonous flowering plants in the family Typhaceae. These plants have a variety of common names, in British English as bulrush or reedmace, in American English as reed, cattail, or punks, in Australia as cumbungi or bulrush, in Canada as bulrush or cattail, and in New Zealand as raupo. Other taxa of plants may be known as bulrush, including some sedges in Scirpus and related genera.

The genus is largely distributed in the Northern Hemisphere, where it is found in a variety of wetland habitats.

The rhizomes are edible, though at least some species are known to accumulate toxins and so must first undergo treatment before being eaten. Evidence of preserved starch grains on grinding stones suggests they were already eaten in Europe 30,000 years ago.

Description
Typha are aquatic or semi-aquatic, rhizomatous, herbaceous perennial plants. The leaves are glabrous (hairless), linear, alternate and mostly basal on a simple, jointless stem that bears the flowering spikes. The plants are monoecious, with  unisexual flowers that develop in dense racemes. The numerous male flowers form a narrow spike at the top of the vertical stem. Each male (staminate) flower is reduced to a pair of stamens and hairs, and withers once the pollen is shed. Large numbers of tiny female flowers form a dense, sausage-shaped spike on the stem below the male spike. When ripe, the heads disintegrate into a cottony fluff from which the seeds disperse by wind.

General ecology

Typha are often among the first wetland plants to colonize areas of newly exposed wet mud, with their abundant wind-dispersed seeds. Buried seeds can survive in the soil for long periods of time. They germinate best with sunlight and fluctuating temperatures, which is typical of many wetland plants that regenerate on mud flats. The plants also spread by rhizomes, forming large, interconnected stands.

Typha are considered to be dominant competitors in wetlands in many areas, and they often exclude other plants with their dense canopy. In the bays of the Great Lakes, for example, they are among the most abundant wetland plants. Different species of cattails are adapted to different water depths.

Well-developed aerenchyma make the plants tolerant of submersion. Even the dead stalks are capable of transmitting oxygen to the rooting zone.

Although Typha are native wetland plants, they can be aggressive in their competition with other native species. They have been problematic in many regions in North America, from the Great Lakes to the Everglades. Native sedges are displaced and wet meadows shrink, likely as a response to altered hydrology of the wetlands and increased nutrient levels. An introduced or hybrid species may be contributing to the problem. Control is difficult. The most successful strategy appears to be mowing or burning to remove the aerenchymous stalks, followed by prolonged flooding. It may be more important to prevent invasion by preserving water level fluctuations, including periods of drought, and to maintain infertile conditions.

Typha are frequently eaten by wetland mammals such as muskrats, which also use them to construct feeding platforms and dens, thereby also providing nesting and resting places for waterfowl.

Accepted species and natural hybrids
The following names are currently accepted:

The most widespread species is Typha latifolia, which is distributed across the entire temperate northern hemisphere. It has also been introduced to Australia. T. angustifolia is nearly as widespread, but does not extend as far north; it may be introduced and invasive in North America. T. domingensis has a more southern American distribution, and it occurs in Australia. T. orientalis is widespread in Asia, Australia, and New Zealand. T. laxmannii, T. minima, and T. shuttleworthii are largely restricted to Asia and southern Europe.

Uses

Culinary
Many parts of the Typha plant are edible to humans. Before the plant flowers, the tender inside of the shoots can be squeezed out and eaten raw or cooked. The starchy rhizomes are nutritious with a protein content comparable to that of maize or rice. They can be processed into a flour with 266 kcal per 100 grams, and are most often harvested from late autumn to early spring. They are fibrous, and the starch must be scraped or sucked from the tough fibers. Baby shoots emerging from the rhizomes, which are sometimes subterranean, can be picked and eaten raw. Also underground is a carbohydrate lump which can be peeled and eaten raw or cooked like a potato. The plant is one championed by survival experts because various parts can be eaten throughout the year. Plants growing in polluted water can accumulate lead and pesticide residues in their rhizomes, and these should not be eaten.

The rind of young stems can be peeled off, and the tender white heart inside can be eaten raw or boiled and eaten like asparagus. This food has been popular among the Cossacks in Russia, and has been called "Cossack asparagus".  The leaf bases can be eaten raw or cooked, especially in late spring when they are young and tender. In early summer the sheath can be removed from the developing green flower spike, which can then be boiled and eaten like corn on the cob. In mid-summer when the male flowers are mature, the pollen can be collected and used as a flour supplement or thickener.

Agriculture
The seeds have a high linoleic acid content and can be used to feed cattle and chickens.
They can also be found in African countries like Ghana.

Harvesting cattail  removes nutrients from the wetland that would otherwise return via the decomposition of decaying plant matter. Floating mats of cattails remove nutrients from eutrophied bodies of freshwater.

Building material
For local native tribes around Lake Titicaca in Peru and Bolivia, Typha were among the most important plants and every part of the plant had multiple uses. For example, they were used to construct rafts and other boats.

During World War II, the United States Navy used the down of Typha as a substitute for kapok in life vests and aviation jackets. Tests showed that even after 100 hours of submersion, the buoyancy was still effective.

Typha are used as thermal insulation in buildings as an organic alternative to conventional insulating materials such as glass wool or stone wool.

Paper
Typha stems and leaves can be used to make paper. It is strong with a heavy texture and it is hard to bleach, so it is not suitable for industrial production of graphical paper. In 1853, considerable amounts of cattail paper were produced in New York, due to a shortage of raw materials. In 1948, French scientists tested methods for annual harvesting of the leaves. Because of the high cost, these methods were abandoned and no further research was done. Today Typha is used to make decorative paper.

Fiber
Fibers up to 4 meters long can be obtained from the stems when they are treated mechanically or chemically with sodium hydroxide. The stem fibers resemble jute and can be used to produce raw textiles. The leaf fibers can be used as an alternative to cotton and linen in clothing. The yield of leaf fiber is 30 to 40 percent and Typha glauca can produce 7 to 10 tons per hectare annually.

Biofuel
Typha can be used as a source of starch to produce ethanol. Because of their high productivity in northern latitudes, Typha are considered to be a bioenergy crop.

Other
The seed hairs were used by some indigenous peoples of the Americas as tinder for starting fires. Some tribes also used Typha down to line moccasins, and for bedding, diapers, baby powder, and cradleboards. One Native American word for Typha meant "fruit for papoose's bed". Typha down is still used in some areas to stuff clothing items and pillows. Typha can be dipped in wax or fat and then lit as a candle, the stem serving as a wick. Without the use of wax or fat it will smolder slowly, somewhat like incense, and may repel insects. 

The flower stalks can be made into chopsticks. The leaves can be treated to weave into baskets, mats, or sandals. The rushes are harvested and the leaves often dried for later use in chair seats.  Re-wetted, the leaves are twisted and wrapped around the chair rungs to form a densely woven seat that is then stuffed (usually with the left over rush).

Small-scale experiments have indicated that Typha are able to remove arsenic from drinking water.
The boiled rootstocks have been used as a diuretic for increasing urination, or mashed to make a jelly-like paste for sores, boils, wounds, burns, scabs, and smallpox pustules.

Cattail pollen is used as a banker source of food for predatory insects and mites (such as Amblyseius swirskii) in greenhouses.

The cattail, or, as it is commonly referred to in the American Midwest, the sausage tail, has been the subject of multiple artist renditions, gaining popularity in the mid-twentieth century. The term, sausage tail, derives from the similarity that cattails have with sausages, a name given to the plant by the Midwest Polish community who had noticed a striking similarity between the plant and a common Polish dish, kiełbasa.

References

External links

 Can you actually eat cattails? from The Straight Dope

 
Aquatic plants
Inflorescence vegetables
Poales genera
Root vegetables